Lead Hill Township is an inactive township in Christian County, Missouri. A school with the same name was also named this because it was a name of ′situation or direction′.

References

Townships in Missouri
Townships in Christian County, Missouri